Christina Marie "Chrissy" Houlahan (née Jampoler; born June 5, 1967) is an American politician, engineer, and former United States Air Force officer. The district includes almost all of Chester County, a suburban county west of Philadelphia, as well as the southern portion of Berks County including the city of Reading. She was first elected in 2018, defeating  Republican Greg McCauley in the midterms.

Early life and education 
Houlahan spent her childhood on various U.S. naval bases across the country, including on Oahu. Her father, Andrew C. A. Jampoler, a naval aviator, was born in Poland, to a Jewish family, and left the country at age four to escape the Holocaust, He became a historian and author.

Houlahan, citing her idols as Indiana Jones and Sally Ride, earned her bachelor's degree in Engineering from Stanford University in 1989, on an AFROTC scholarship. She then earned a master's degree in Technology and Policy from the Massachusetts Institute of Technology in 1994.

Earlier career

Military service 
After graduation from Stanford University, Houlahan spent three years on United States Air Force active duty at Hanscom Air Force Base in Bedford, Massachusetts. There, she served as a project manager working on air and space defense technologies. She left active duty in 1991 for the Air Force Reserve, separating from the service in 2004 as a captain.

Private sector 
After leaving active duty, Houlahan went to work for the start-up sportswear company AND1 as Chief Operating Officer. As part of the employee benefits program the company offered 40 paid hours of community service at a location of the employee's choosing. Houlahan dedicated her hours to working with girls and women in science, technology, engineering, and math (STEM). Houlahan became Chief Operating Officer of B-Lab, a non-profit start-up, when AND1 was sold.

Education career 
Citing a need to experience the problems in the U.S. educational system first-hand, Houlahan entered the lifelong learning program at University of Pennsylvania where she re-took courses in the hard sciences. She enrolled in the Teach for America program and began working as an 11th-grade science teacher at Simon Gratz High School in Philadelphia. She withdrew from the Teach for America program after one year and joined Springboard Collaborative, a Philadelphia-based nonprofit focusing on early childhood literacy in underserved populations nationwide. Houlahan served as both president and CFO/COO of Springboard Collaborative before leaving to focus on her political campaign.

U.S. House of Representatives

Elections

2018 

Houlahan has said that one of the experiences that motivated her to run for Congress was her organization of a bus trip to the Women's March in Washington, D.C., on January 21, 2017. When asked why she chose to begin her political career by running for Congress and not a lower office, she said, “I don’t have time for that. The stakes are too high, and I think I’m qualified."

Houlahan expected to face two-term Republican incumbent Ryan Costello. However, Costello pulled out of the race after the Supreme Court of Pennsylvania threw out Pennsylvania's congressional map as an unconstitutional partisan Republican gerrymander. While Costello was the only incumbent to retain his previous district number, it was made significantly more compact and bluer than its predecessor. It lost its heavily Republican western portion around Lebanon, which had only been connected to the rest of the district by way of a tendril through Berks County. Instead, it now took in almost all of Chester County (except for a sliver around Birmingham Township that was drawn into the neighboring 5th district), along with the more Democratic southern portion of Berks County, including Reading.

Houlahan took the Democratic nomination unopposed and faced first-time candidate Greg McCauley in the general election. On November 6, 2018, Houlahan easily defeated McCauley, garnering 58.8% of the vote over McCauley's 41.1%. Houlahan was one of seven Pennsylvania women running for the U.S. House of Representatives in 2018, and one of four Democratic women to win, along with Mary Gay Scanlon, Madeleine Dean and Susan Wild. She also joined two other female veterans in the House freshman class, former naval officers Elaine Luria and Mikie Sherrill.

Upon taking office in January 2019, Houlahan became the first Democrat to represent a Chester County-based district in 166 years. The county had historically been very Republican, but has trended much more Democratic in recent years.

Houlahan ran on a platform that included healthcare, job creation, and campaign finance reform. Other campaign issues she identified included education, family issues, and veteran's issues. Houlahan had a strong record of campaign fundraising, with donations totaling almost $5 million so far. She was also endorsed by many organizations, including Emily's List, Human Rights Campaign, Giffords Law Center to Prevent Gun Violence, Project 100, Vote Vets, the Service Employees International Union-PA (SEIU PA) and several other local unions.

2020 

Houlahan ran for re-election in 2020 against Republican John Emmons. She was reelected with over 56% of the vote.

2022 

Houlahan had publicly expressed interest in a 2022 campaign for the United States Senate, but on June 8, she announced she would run for reelection to the House.

Tenure

Foreign policy 
During the Russo-Ukrainian War, Houlahan signed a letter advocating for President Biden to give F-16 fighter jets to Ukraine.

Healthcare 
Houlahan supports the government negotiating drug prices with the pharmaceutical companies and a public option, but opposes a single payer healthcare system.

LGBT rights 
She supports same-sex marriage, the Equality Act, and opposes President Trump's memorandum banning transgender individuals from the military. In January 2019, she said she opposed withdrawing US troops from Syria.

Market regulations 
In 2022, Houlahan was one of 16 Democrats to vote against the Merger Filing Fee Modernization Act of 2022, an antitrust package that would crack down on corporations for anti-competitive behavior.

Caucus memberships 

 Servicewomen and Female Veterans Caucus (Co-Chair)
 Women in STEM Caucus
 For Country Caucus 
 New Democrat Coalition
 Honor and Civility Caucus
 Congressional National Service Caucus
 Veterans' Education Caucus
 Congressional LGBTQ+ Equality Caucus
 Sustainable Energy & Environment Coalition
Problem Solvers Caucus

Committee assignments

117th Congress 
Committee on Armed Services
Subcommittee on Intelligence, Emerging Threats and Capabilities
United States House Armed Services Subcommittee on Readiness
Committee on Foreign Affairs
Subcommittee on Africa, Global Health, Global Human Rights and International Organizations
Subcommittee on Asia, the Pacific and Nonproliferation
Committee on Small Business

118th Congress 

 Committee on Armed Services
 Subcommittee on Military Personnel
 Subcommittee on Strategic Forces
 Permanent Select Committee on Intelligence
 Defense Intelligence and Overhead Architecture - Ranking member

Electoral history

Personal life 
Houlahan lives in Devon, Pennsylvania, with her husband Bart, whom she met at Stanford and married in 1991. They put on hold their goal of running a foot race in every state before age 50 when she entered the race for U.S. Representative. The couple has two adult daughters.

See also 
 Women in the United States House of Representatives

References

External links

 Congresswoman Chrissy Houlahan official U.S. House website
Chrissy Houlahan for Congress

|-

1968 births
21st-century American politicians
American political candidates
Candidates in the 2018 United States elections
Democratic Party members of the United States House of Representatives from Pennsylvania
Female members of the United States House of Representatives
Living people
Massachusetts Institute of Technology alumni
American people of Polish-Jewish descent
Stanford University alumni
Teach For America alumni
United States Air Force officers
21st-century American women politicians